Aluminium Arak Football Club (Bashgah-e Futbal-e Aluminium Arak), commonly known as Aluminium Arak, is an Iranian football club based in Arak, Markazi, that competes in the Persian Gulf Pro League. The club was founded as PAS Arak Football Club in 2001. The club is part of Aluminium Arak Sport and Cultural Club.

The football team plays their home games at the Imam Khomeini Stadium which has a seating capacity of 15,000. The club is owned and supported by the IRALCO (Iranian Aluminium Company).

History

Establishment
The club was founded as PAS Arak Football Club in 2001. They played their first year in Azadegan League and were relegated at the end of the season.

Sanaye Arak
In 2002 the club changed their name to Sanaye Arak Football Club. Although they did not participate in 2002–03 Iran 2nd Division they were able to play next season in Azadegan League. Sanaye Arak played six years in Azadegan League. Prior to the start of the 2007–08 season, Sanaye Arak moved from their old stadium to the new Imam Khomeini Stadium, which the club shares today with Shahrdari Arak. In 2008 Sanaye Arak was bought by the Iranian Aluminium Company (IRALCO).

Difficult years
Due to financial problems, Sanaye Arak was bought by the Iranian Aluminium Company (IRALCO) in 2008. They changed the name to Aluminium Arak Football Club. They finished fourth in that season. Only one year later Aluminium Arak terminated their sports activities due to financial problems.

After Aluminium Arak terminated their sports activities, Shensa took over the club. The club was known as Shensa Arak Football Club in 2009–10 Azadegan League. They finished 11th in that season.

Only one year later again, Hamyari Arak took over Shensa and named the club Hamyari Arak Football Club. They finished 11th in the 2010–11 Azadegan League season.

Shahrdari Arak

In 2011 Municipality of Arak took over the club and named it Shahrdari Arak Football Club. After relegated at the end of the 2012–13 Azadegan League season, Shahrdari Arak finished 13th in 2013–14 Iran 2nd Division. Although the Iranian Aluminium Company (IRALCO) bought the club again in 2014, Shahrdari Arak were able to play in the 2015–16 League 3 season as an own club.

Aluminium Arak
In summer 2014 the Iranian Aluminium Company (IRALCO) bought the club again. They finished first in 2014–15 League 2 and comes back to Azadegan League. They finished ninth in the 2015–16 Azadegan League season.

Aluminum impressed in the 2016–17 Hazfi Cup, as they defeated Persian Gulf Pro League side Paykan 1–0, before losing to five time Persian Gulf Pro League champions Sepahan. They finished the 2016–17 Azadegan League season on place nine.

Name history
PAS Arak Football Club (2001–2002)
Sanaye Arak Football Club (2002–2008)
Aluminium Arak Football Club (2008–2009)
Shensa Arak Football Club (2009–2010)
Hamyari Arak Football Club (2010–2011)
Shahrdari Arak Football Club (2011–2014)
Aluminium Arak Football Club (2014–present)

Crest

Stadium

Aluminium Arak plays their home games at the Imam Khomeini Stadium which has a seating capacity of 15,000. The stadium was opened in 2007 and is owned by the Iran Physical Education Organization. It is also the home venue of local rival Shahrdari Arak.

Seasons
The table below chronicles the achievements of Aluminium Arak in various competitions since 2001.

Notes:The Persian Gulf Pro League was formerly known as Iran Pro League (IPL) and Persian Gulf Cup (PGC)  The Azadegan League was the highest division between 1991 and 2001  The League 2 was formerly known as Iran 2nd Division  The League 3 was formerly known as Iran 3rd Division

Honours

Domestic
  Azadegan League
Runners-up (1): 2019–20

  League 2
Winners (1): 2014–15

Players

First team squad

For recent transfers, see List of Iranian football transfers summer 2022.

Coaches

Coaches since 2002

See also
 Azadegan League
 Shahrdari Arak

References

 
Football clubs in Iran
Association football clubs established in 2001
2001 establishments in Iran